is a former Japanese football player.

Playing career
Hayashi was born in Nara on October 14, 1980. After graduating from high school, he joined J1 League club JEF United Ichihara (later JEF United Chiba) in 1999. He played many matches as substitute forward for a long time from first season. The club won the 3rd place in 2001 and 2003 J1 League and the champions in 2005 J.League Cup. In 2006, he moved to Kyoto Purple Sanga (later Kyoto Sanga FC). Although he played many matches as substitute forward, the club finished at the bottom place. In 2007, he move to Júbilo Iwata on loan. However he could not play many matches. In 2008, he returned to Kyoto Sanga FC. He played many matches over two seasons. In 2010, he moved to his first club, JEF United Chiba. However he could not play many matches. In 2012, he moved to Thai club BEC Tero Sasana. In July 2012, he returned to Japan and joined J2 club Oita Trinita. The club finished in sixth place and qualified for the promotion playoff. In the promotion playoff final, he scored a winning goal in the 86th minute and the club was promoted to J1 in 2013. He retired at the end of the 2013 season.

Club statistics

Honors and awards
Topscorer in All Japan High School Soccer Tournament: 1998

References

External links

1980 births
Living people
Association football people from Nara Prefecture
Japanese footballers
J1 League players
J2 League players
JEF United Chiba players
Kyoto Sanga FC players
Júbilo Iwata players
Oita Trinita players
Association football forwards